Cerconota tricharacta is a moth of the family Depressariidae. It is found in Brazil (Amazonas) and French Guiana.

References

Moths described in 1925
Cerconota
Taxa named by Edward Meyrick